Larry Haun (May 6, 1931 - October 24, 2011) was an American union journeyman carpenter and author known for his skills and techniques expressed through his career in production home building as well as his instructional videos and books on the subject.

Early life
Larry Haun was born on May 6, 1931 to Henry and Elizabeth Haun in Harrisburg, Nebraska where he was raised Catholic.

Career
Haun spent five decades as a production framer during a housing construction boom in California in business with his brothers Joe and Jim. Larry was known for his ability to set a nail with two swings of a hammer. Later in his career he taught at a community college for twenty years and built homes for Habitat for Humanity. He also contributed to a blog connected to Fine Homebuilding magazine up until his passing. With a local carpenter's union and later with Taunton Press, Haun produced instructional videos and books that detailed production framing in home building. Shortly before his death he donated most of his tools to a local high school.

Personal life
An avid marathon runner, Larry ran the LA Marathon three times while in his 60s. His favourite genre of music was bluegrass. He always had a garden where he lived and encouraged his children to eat organic foods and read books. Larry's wife Mila states that he was interested and involved in Native American culture and as well as Buddhism. He was opposed to the Vietnam War.

Death
Larry died on October 24, 2011 from lymphoma.

Legacy
Scott Wadsworth of Essential Craftsman states that Haun's book, The Very Efficient Carpenter, gave him great inspiration throughout his career as a professional carpenter as Haun focused on devising methods and techniques to be more efficient while retaining quality.

Videos

Books
Larry Haun authored the following books about carpentry:

References

External links
 A Carpenter's View, Larry Haun's Blog

1931 births
2011 deaths
American carpenters
People from Banner County, Nebraska
People from Coos Bay, Oregon
University of California, Los Angeles alumni